Nesotriccus is a genus of Central and South American birds in the tyrant flycatcher family Tyrannidae.

Species
The genus contains five species:

The Tumbesian tyrannulet was formerly considered conspecific with the widespread southern mouse-colored tyrannulet. The two species are visually very similar, but vocally distinct.

References

Nesotriccus
Bird genera